2,3-Dihydrothiophene is a heterocyclic compound and an organosulfur compound with the formula SC4H6.  It is isomeric with the more symmetrical 2,5-dihydrothiophene.  Both isomers of dihydrothiophene are colorless liquids with a thioether-like odor. In terms of their reactivity, both isomers exhibit characteristics of alkenes and thioethers, undergoing addition reactions at carbon and oxidation at sulfur. In contrast, thiophene engages in neither reaction.

Dihydrothiophenes in nature
Dihydrothiophenes contribute to the aroma of the white truffle. The major component is 3-methyl-4,5-dihydrothiophene (alternative name:4-methyl-2,3-dihydrothiophene), produced by bacterial colonies in the truffle's fruiting bodies.

References

Sulfur heterocycles